The 2021–22 season was the 77th season in the existence of VfL Wolfsburg and the club's 25th consecutive season in the top flight of German football. In addition to the domestic league, VfL Wolfsburg participated in this season's editions of the DFB-Pokal and the UEFA Champions League, after finishing fourth in the previous Bundesliga season.

Players

First-team squad

Players out on loan

Transfers

In

Out

Pre-season and friendlies

Competitions

Overall record

Bundesliga

League table

Results summary

Results by round

Matches
The league fixtures were announced on 25 June 2021.

DFB-Pokal

UEFA Champions League

Group stage

The draw for the group stage was held on 26 August 2021.

Statistics

Appearances and goals

|-
! colspan=14 style=background:#dcdcdc; text-align:center| Goalkeepers

|-
! colspan=14 style=background:#dcdcdc; text-align:center| Defenders
 
 
 

  
 

|-
! colspan=14 style=background:#dcdcdc; text-align:center| Midfielders

  

 

|-
! colspan=14 style=background:#dcdcdc; text-align:center| Forwards

 

|-
! colspan=14 style=background:#dcdcdc; text-align:center| Players transferred out during the season 

 
 

|-

Goalscorers

References

VfL Wolfsburg seasons
Wolfsburg
Wolfsburg